William Stobb is an American poet and professor. He is the author of the National Poetry Series selection, Nervous Systems (Penguin 2007), Absentia (Penguin 2011), and You Are Still Alive (42 Miles Press 2019) as well as three chapbooks.

Life
William Stobb was born in Little Falls, Minnesota. He graduated from the University of North Dakota and the University of Nevada. He teaches at University of Wisconsin–La Crosse.

His work has appeared in American Poetry Review, Colorado Review, American Literary Review, North Dakota Quarterly, Kenyon Review, and Denver Quarterly. He creates audio art that can be heard on SoundCloud.

He is Associate Editor of Conduit, a literary magazine based in St. Paul. He was chair of the Wisconsin Poet Laureate Commission from 2014-2017. His monthly column on poetry and poetics, “Hard to Say”, was podcast by miPOradio from 2004-2010.

He has presented at the Association of Writers & Writing Programs (AWP) Conference.

He lives in La Crosse, Wisconsin.

Awards
 1994 Academy of American Poets' Thomas McGrath Award
 2000 Nevada Arts Council Poetry Fellowship
 2006 National Poetry Series
2012 Spoon River Poetry Review Editors' Prize.
2014 Science Fiction Poetry Association Long Form Prize
2016 Science Fiction Poetry Association Long Form Prize
2019 Council for Wisconsin Writers Zona Gale Award for Short Fiction
2019 42 Miles Press Book Award

Bibliography

Poetry collections
 
   .
  .

Poetry chapbooks
  University of Nevada.
  University of Nevada.

References

External links
"Author's website"
Author's Academy of American Poets entry.
"Hard to Say", miPOradio
"A Brief Interruption" and "Entropic," Diode 12.2, 2017.
"What Is Happening" and "Earl of Rochester," Kenyon Review 37.4
"Absentia"; "Natural History", The Offending Adam 001.2, 2010
"In a Mountain Pasture "; "Some Purple"; "Release"; "In/and", Jacket 35, 2008
"Pointless Channel"; "I Struggle to Live in Harmony / with the Forms", Pistol Magazine, March 7, 2008

Year of birth missing (living people)
Living people
People from Little Falls, Minnesota
Writers from La Crosse, Wisconsin
American male poets
Poets from Minnesota
Poets from Wisconsin
University of North Dakota alumni
University of Nevada alumni
Viterbo University faculty
University of Wisconsin–La Crosse faculty